Beverly is an American, Brooklyn-based band that formed in 2013. They began recording their debut LP, Careers, in 2013 and finished in early 2014. It was released on July 1, 2014 on Williamsburg-based Kanine Records.

Beverly's original lineup consisted of Frankie Rose and Drew Citron, both from the Brooklyn indie music scene. Rose is a former member of Crystal Stilts, Vivian Girls, and Dum Dum Girls, while Citron is a former member of Avan Lava. They released their first single, "Honey Do", on Gorilla vs. Bear on February 10, 2014, and it was quickly picked up by other notable music blogs such as Pitchfork Media. The track was featured on Kanine Records' Record Store Day compilation Non Violent Femmes.

Discography
 Careers (2014)
 The Blue Swell (2016)

References

American musical duos
Indie rock musical groups from New York (state)
Musical groups established in 2013
Musical groups from Brooklyn
2013 establishments in New York City